São Lázaro  is the smallest civil parish of Macau, located in the central-east region of the Macau Peninsula. It is surrounded by the parishes of Nossa Senhora de Fátima, Santo António, and Sé.

This parish was one of five in the former Municipality of Macau, one of Macau's two municipalities that were abolished on 31 December 2001 by Law No. 17/2001, following the 1999 transfer of sovereignty over Macau from Portugal to China. While their administrative functions have since been removed, these parishes are still retained nominally.

Education
Tertiary education:
 United Nations University Institute on Computing and Society

Primary and secondary schools
Public schools:
 Macao Conservatory - Headquarters and school of Music
 The school of music is designated as a public secondary school programme. It is located in this parish.
 Escola Secundária Luso-Chinesa de Luís Gonzaga Gomes
 Escola Primária Oficial Luso-Chinesa "Sir Robert Ho Tung" (何東中葡小學) - Preschool, primary school, and special education
 Escola Primária Luso-Chinesa da Flora (二龍喉中葡小學)

Private tuition-free schools:
 Chan Sui Ki Perpetual Help College - Primary and secondary school
 Yuet Wah College - Preschool through secondary school
 Escola Kai Chi (啟智學校) - Special education

Private non-free schools:
 Pui Ching Middle School - Preschool through secondary school
 Jardim de Infância "D. José da Costa Nunes" (魯彌士主教幼稚園) - Preschool

Public library

The parish is home to Macao Central Library, the main library of the Macao Public Library system.

Healthcare
The Macau government operates the Centro de Saúde Macau Oriental (塔石衛生中心) in Tap Seac.

Tourist attractions
 Archives of Macao
 Guia Fortress
 Lou Lim Ieoc Garden
 Macau Tea Culture House
 St. Lazarus' Church
 Sun Yat Sen Memorial House
 Tai Fung Tong Art House
 Tap Seac Multi-sports Pavilion
 Tap Seac Square
 Vasco da Gama Garden
 Victory Garden
Guia Municipal Park
Guia Cable Car
Jardim da Flora
Guia Tunnel
Estrada de Cacilhas
Avenida do Conselheiro Ferreira de Almeida

See also
 Parishes of Macau

References

External links

Freguesias da RAEM 
Ferreira de Almeida

Freguesias of Macau
Macau Peninsula